Hugo Vogel (15 February 1855, Magdeburg - 26 September 1934, Berlin) was a German painter, known primarily for historical scenes and portraits.

Life 
His father was a merchant. After graduating from the Realschule in Magdeburg in 1874, he entered the Kunstakademie Düsseldorf, where he studied with Wilhelm Sohn and Eduard von Gebhardt among others. He completed his courses there in 1880 and, three years later, exhibited several historical paintings at the Prussian Academy of Arts. 

In 1886, following an extended visit to Italy, he settled in Berlin. The following year, he was given a professorship at the Academy, a position he held until 1892, when he lost it as a result of the "Munch Affair". This involved an exhibit by the Norwegian artist Edvard Munch that was closed by the Academy's conservative Director, Anton von Werner. In protest, Vogel and several other painters joined together to create the "", a precursor to the Berlin Secession. Among his notable students during his tenure were August von Brandis and Clara Siewert.

In 1893, he went to Paris to study with Jules Lefebvre. After that, he travelled throughout Spain, North Africa, Italy and the Low Countries. In 1900, he was awarded a gold medal at the "Große Berliner Kunstausstellung", a prestigious art exhibition held from 1893 to 1969. 

In addition to his canvases, he created frescoes with historical themes in several town halls; notably in Berlin, Hamburg and Merseburg. In 1902, the fresco in Merseburg, Der deutsche Michael, became the subject of plagiarism accusations when the magazine, pointed out its resemblance to an equestrian statue by Paul Dubois, depicting Joan of Arc.

From 1915 to 1917, during World War I, he accompanied Paul von Hindenburg to the Eastern Front as his official portrait painter.

He is buried at Wannsee Cemetery. Streets in Magdeburg and Berlin have been named in his honor.

References

Further reading 
 Hugo Vogel, Als ich Hindenburg malte (When I Painted Hindenburg), Ullstein Verlag, 1927
Sabine Liebscher. In the Magdeburger Biographisches Lexikon, Magdeburg 2002,

External links 

ArtNet: More works by Vogel.
 
 

1855 births
1934 deaths
19th-century German painters
19th-century German male artists
20th-century German painters
20th-century German male artists
Academic staff of the Prussian Academy of Arts
German portrait painters
History painters
Fresco painters
Artists from Magdeburg